The Medal for Merit was, during the period it was awarded, the highest civilian decoration of the United States. It was awarded by the President of the United States to civilians who "distinguished themselves by exceptionally meritorious conduct in the performance of outstanding services" in the war effort "since the proclamation of an emergency by the President on September 8, 1939". Awards to civilians of foreign nations were eligible "only for the performance of exceptionally meritorious or courageous act or acts in furtherance of the war efforts of the United Nations."

The medal is made of gold-finished bronze and enamel and is worn on the left chest from a ribbon.

History
Created during World War II, and awarded to "civilians of the nations prosecuting the war under the joint declaration of the United Nations and of other friendly foreign nations", the medal has not been awarded since 1952.

The Medal for Merit is currently listed as seventh in order of precedence of U.S. civilian decorations, below the Silver Lifesaving Medal and above the National Intelligence Distinguished Service Medal.

Civilians of foreign nations could receive the award for the performance of an exceptionally meritorious or courageous act or acts in furtherance of the war efforts of the Allies against the Axis Powers. The next foreign civilian to receive the medal was Edgar Sengier, the director of the Belgian Union Minière du Haut Katanga during World War II. Stephenson had the code name "Intrepid" during World War II. Some writers consider Stephenson to be one of the real life inspirations for the fictitious character "James Bond".
Another recipient was Sir Robert Watson-Watt, a British pioneer of radar, who created a chain of radar stations around the UK which enabled advance information to be available to the Royal Air Force of incoming German aircraft and was instrumental in the winning of the 1940 Battle of Britain. He was sent to the US in 1941 to advise on air defense, after Japan's attack on Pearl Harbor. He was awarded the US Medal for Merit in 1946.

All proposed awards were considered by the Medal for Merit Board, consisting of three members appointed by the president, of whom one was appointed as the chairman of the board. This medal cannot be awarded for any action relating to the prosecution of World War II after the end of hostilities (as proclaimed by Proclamation No. 2714 of ), and no proposal for this award for such services could be submitted after . The last medal of this type was awarded in 1952 after a long delay in processing.

Notable recipients

See also
President's Certificate of Merit

References

External links

 NARA – Federal Register – Executive Order 9637 – Medal for Merit
 Exploring the Medal for Merit, Philip J. Schlegel, 2012. Includes list of recipients (PDF).

1942 establishments in the United States
Awards established in 1942
Awards disestablished in 1946
Civil awards and decorations of the United States
Establishments by United States executive order

United States in World War II